Dharitri Terangpi (born 24 February 1996) better known as Babie and Nirdhar, is a woman Royal Enfield bullet biker from Guwahati, India. Terangpi is a competitive motorcyclist, long-distance rider and photographer. Terangpi believes in female empowerment, and is establishing an awareness campaign of safe riding among the biker groups of Northeast India.

Early life
Terangpi was born on 24 February 1996. She formed a riding group named Niradhar, a backronym consisting the initials of the members' names. "Niradhar" means determination, and the group intend to inspire women to follow their passion.

Achievements
Dharitri has covered , traveling through eight Indian states. She is the first female rider from the Indian state of Assam to do so.

Gallery

References

External links
 conflatingvisions

Assamese people
Indian activists
Indian women activists
1994 births
Living people